Statistics of Bahraini Premier League in the 1973–74 season.

Overview
Muharraq Club won the championship.

References
RSSSF

Bahraini Premier League seasons
Bah
football